Asclepiades is the name of:
 An epithet for the children of Asclepius; Hygieia, Iaso, Aceso, Aegle, Panacea, Meditrina, Machaon, Podaleirios, Telesphoros, Aratus
 Asclepiades of Tragilus (4th century BC), critic and mythographer, author of Tragoidoumena, cited in the Bibliotheca
 Asclepiades of Phlius (fl. 4th–3rd century BC), philosopher in the Eretrian school of Philosophy
 Asclepiades of Samos (fl. 3rd century BC), lyric poet
 Asclepiades of Myrlea (fl. 2nd-1st century BC), Greek historian and grammar in Rome and Spain
 Asclepiades of Bithynia (fl. c. 120–c. 40 BC), philosopher and physician from Prusa, Bithynia
 Caius Calpurnius Asclepiades of Prusa, b. 88 CE, second century physician
 Asclepiades Pharmacion (fl. 1st–2nd century), Greek physician
 Asclepiades of Antioch (died 217), Patriarch of Antioch, Christian saint and martyr
 Asclepiades (fl. c. 250), Christian saint and martyr (see Pionius)
 Asclepiades the Cynic (fl. 4th century), Cynic philosopher

See also 
 Asclepiad (disambiguation)
 Asclepius (disambiguation)